Horst Weidenmüller is a German music executive producer and entrepreneur, founder of !K7 Music. He has been part of the music industry since the early 1980s when he began as a producer of concert video footage of musicians in the punk music genre. He founded !K7 in 1985 and became an influential part of the Berlin techno music industry in the early 1990s. Weidenmüller curated and produced a popular techno music audiovisual series, which aired on MTV in the mid-1990s. He also serves on the board of several trade associations, including the IMPALA where he was co-president until 2011. Since its founding in 2008, he has also served on the board of the digital rights agency Merlin Network.

Early life 
Weidenmüller was born in the Black Forest region of West Germany. He moved to Berlin in 1982.

Career 
Weidenmüller founded Studio !K7 (now known as !K7 Music) in 1985 in Berlin at the age of 21. It was located at Kaiserdamm 7, an address that became the inspiration for the company's name. He produced live video footage of concerts by Nick Cave, Einstürzende Neubauten, Crime & the City Solution, and Lydia Lunch.

Weidenmüller became an influential part of the Berlin techno music industry in the early 1990s. In 1993, he released his first  video cassette. These remix videos combined DJ mixes with computer animation for at-home viewing. In the mid-1990s, X-Mix videos, including those of Laurent Garnier or Richie Hawtin, were aired at night on MTV. X-Mix became a platform by which artists working in computer graphics could showcase their nascent art form. As Germany was reunified, techno had become popular in both East and West Germany and, according to the German magazine Der Spiegel, "X-Mix gave techno a face", bringing it out of the dark basement venues where it initiated. Weidenmüller also started DJ-Kicks, a DJ mix series first released in 1993, which released its 72nd edition in August 2020.

In 2008, Weidenmüller acquired Strut Records and relaunched the label under the !K7. In the early 2010s, he started an artists management division and signed on to manage the rapper Tricky. Tricky wrote in his biography, Hell Is Around The Corner (2019), how Weidenmüller helped him rectify his finances and build a new catalogue of music for which he retained the rights.! K7 Management also began representing Mykki Blanco, Brandt Brauer Frick, Marquis Hawkes, and Portable.

In 2017, Weidenmueller created a classical music label 7K!, and signed several composers and musicians from the neoclassical genre, including Luca D'Alberto, Niklas Paschburg and Henrik Schwarz. Weidenmueller was the Executive Producer on Endless, D'Alberto's 2017 album. He was also Creative Director on Paschburg's 2018 album, Oceanic. In 2019, Weidenmüller created Ever Records, a jazz label, and signed musicians such as the Kansas Smitty's House Band.

Over the years of !K7, Weidenmüller has also worked with the artists Kruder & Dorfmeister, Matthew Herbert, Fat Freddy's Drop, Peggy Gou, The Whitest Boy Alive, Forest Swords, Moodymann, Henrik Schwarz, Carl Craig, Einstürzende Neubauten, Grandmaster Flash, Hercules & Love Affair and Madlib. His label group, !K7 Music, includes !K7 Records, Strut Records, AUS, 7K! and Ever Records.

Associations 
He has served on the board of several associations representing independent artists and record labels. He has served on the board of directors of the IMPALA since 2003. He joined the executive team at IMPALA in 2006 and served as co-president until 2011. Since its founding in 2008, Weidenmüller has also been on the board of Merlin Network, the largest organization representing independent digital rights holders.

Discography 

 2017 – Luca D'Alberto – Endless
 2018 – Niklas Paschburg – Oceanic
 2018 – Henrik Schwarz – Scripted Orkestra
 2018 – Luca D'Alberto – Exile
 2019 – Henrik Schwarz & Alma Quartet – Plunderphonia

References 

People from Baden-Württemberg
German music people
1964 births
Living people